Selvagem Grande Island is part of the Savage Islands archipelago, which themselves are part of the Portuguese Autonomous Region of Madeira in the North Atlantic Ocean.

The island belongs to the northeast group of the Savage Islands, which comprises in addition three islets: Sinho Islet, Palheiro de Terra and Palheiro do Mar.

It is generally flat, but has three summits, remnants of former volcanic cones appropriately named Atalaia, Tornozelos and Inferno, Atalaia being the highest of the three, reaching  in altitude.

The island has three residents year-round, two park rangers and a biologist.

The island has a lighthouse, which is automated.

References

Islands of Portugal
Savage Islands